Craver Apartment Building is a historic apartment building located at Winston-Salem, Forsyth County, North Carolina.  It was built about 1942, and is a two-story, five bay, brick-veneered rectangular block structure with hipped roof and exposed rafter ends.  It has a hipped roof and exposed rafter ends in the Bungalow / American Craftsman style. It features porches on both levels supported by full-height square brick posts. The building was built as rental apartments for African-American families just before World War II.

It was listed on the National Register of Historic Places in 1998.

References

African-American history in Winston-Salem, North Carolina
Residential buildings on the National Register of Historic Places in North Carolina
Residential buildings completed in 1942
Buildings and structures in Winston-Salem, North Carolina
National Register of Historic Places in Winston-Salem, North Carolina
1942 establishments in North Carolina
Apartment buildings in North Carolina
Apartment buildings on the National Register of Historic Places